The 6th Women's Chess Olympiad, organized by FIDE, took place on 15 September to 7 October 1974 in Medellín, Colombia.

Twenty-five nations took part in the women's Olympiad. From five preliminary groups the teams were split into three finals. 

The Soviet Union won.

Preliminaries

 Group 1: 

 Group 2:

 Group 3:

 Group 4:

 Group 5:

Finals

{| class="wikitable"
|+ Final A
! # !! Country !! Players !! Averagerating !! Points !! MP !! Playoff score
|-
| style="background:gold;"|1 ||  || Nona Gaprindashvili, Nana Alexandria, Irina Levitina || 2380 || 13½ || 14 || 3
|-
| style="background:silver;"|2 ||  || Elisabeta Polihroniade, Gertrude Baumstark, Margareta Teodorescu || 2233 || 13½ || 14 || 1
|-
| style="background:#cc9966;"|3 ||  || Tatjana Lematschko, Antonina Georgieva, Venka Asenova || 2233 || 13 || 14 ||
|-
| 4 ||  || Mária Ivánka, Zsuzsa Verőci, Mária Porubszky-Angyalosine || 2300 || 13 || 13 ||
|-
| 5 ||  || Corry Vreeken, Ada van der Giessen, Erika Belle || 2115 || 9½ ||  ||
|-
| 6 ||  || Květa Eretová, Štěpánka Vokřálová, Margita Polanová || 2195 || 9 ||  ||
|-
| 7 ||  || Milunka Lazarević, Katarina Jovanović, Vlasta Kalchbrenner || 2203 || 7½ ||  ||
|-
| 8 ||  || Anne Sunnucks, Elaine Pritchard, Sheila Jackson || 2068 || 4 || 3 ||
|-
| 9 ||  || Anni Laakmann, Ursula Wasnetsky || 2103 || 4 || 3 ||
|-
| 10 ||  || Smilja Vujosevic, Claire Demers, Marie Bernard || 2033 || 3 || ||   
|}

{| class="wikitable"
|+ Final B
! # !! Country !! Players !! Averagerating !! Points !! MP
|-
| 11 ||  || Pepita Ferrer Lucas, María del Pino García Padrón, Nieves García Vicente || 1938 || 13½ || 16 
|-
| 12 ||  || Olga Podrazhanskaya, Lea Nudelman || 2105 || 13½ || 16 
|-
| 13 ||  || Ruth Cardoso, Ivone Moysés, Norma Snitkowsky ||  2008 || 11 ||  
|-
| 14 ||  || Mona May Karff, Ruth Herstein, Ruth Haring || 2048|| 10½ || 
|-
| 15 ||  || Solveig Haraldsson, Jolanta Dahlin, Ingrid Svensson || 2025 || 9½ || 
|-
| 16 ||  || Ingeborg Kattinger, Wilma Samt, Alfreda Hausner || 1965 || 8½ || 
|-
| 17 ||  || Ilse Guggenberger, Rosalba Patiño, Lilith Velásquez || – || 8 || 
|-
| 18 ||  || Johanna Tuomainen, Sirkka-Liisa Vuorenpää, Marjatta Palasto ||  1880|| 6 || 
|-
| 19 ||  || Hyroko Maeda, Kyoto Watanabe, Miyoko Watai ||  1825 || 5 || 
|-
| 20 ||  || Dorren O'Siochrú, Aileen Noonan, Ann Shouldice ||  1830 || 4½ || 
|}

{| class="wikitable"
|+ Final C
! # !! Country !! Players !! Points !! MP
|-
| 21 ||  || Aida Camps de Ocampo, Gloria Vega, Catalina Batres || 7½ || 
|-
| 22 ||  || Ruth Rodríguez Ramírez, Sara Castellón de Santana, Dyalma Flores Cortés || 7 || 
|-
| 23 ||  || Z. A. Al-Hariry, Shemin Al-Soud, Suad Said Al-Sarraj || 5 || 5
|-
| 24 ||  "B" || N. Betancur, Maria Idalia Zapata, Doris Soler || 5 || 5 
|-
| 25 ||  || Martine Cellario, Anne Maria Macia || 4 || 
|-
| 26 ||  || Ana Ríos Planes, Elzebir Castillo, Lidia Ferrer || 1½ || 
|}

Final «A» 

 Play-off for gold: Soviet Union-Romania 3-1 (2-0, 1-1)

Final «B»

Final «C»

Individual medals

 Board 1:  Nona Gaprindashvili  10 / 12 = 83.3%
 Board 2:  Nana Alexandria 6½ / 8 = 81.3%
 Reserve:  Irina Levitina 8 / 10 = 80.0%

References

External links
Women's Chess Olympiad: Medellín 1974 OlimpBase

Women's Chess Olympiads
Olympiad w6
Chess Olympiad w4
Olympiad w4
Chess Olympiad w4
September 1974 sports events in South America
October 1974 sports events in South America
International sports competitions hosted by Colombia